Trevor Perea (born August 19, 1981) is a retired American soccer player who played two seasons in Major League Soccer for Columbus Crew and D.C. United. Perea played college soccer for Duke University.

Career

Youth and college 
Perea played high school soccer in his native Dallas, playing for the  Dallas Jesuit Rangers. He played college soccer for Duke University, where he was a four-year starter. Perea made 53 appearances for the Blue Devils, tallying eight goals.

Senior 
Ahead of the 2003 Major League Soccer season, Perea signed as an undrafted free agent with Columbus Crew. On June 14, 2003, Perea made his debut coming on for Brian Maisonneuve in the 56th minute. Columbus lost the match 0–3. On August 23, 2003, he was traded to D.C. United, where he played one match with United before being released after the 2003 season.

Perea subsequently retired from professional soccer. Since retirement, Perea has moved out to Los Angeles and works as a Tax Assessor for PricewaterhouseCoopers.

References

External links 
 Trevor Perea at MLSSoccer.com
 Trevor Perea at Duke University Athletics

1981 births
Living people
Association football midfielders
Columbus Crew players
D.C. United players
Duke Blue Devils men's soccer players
Jesuit College Preparatory School of Dallas alumni
Major League Soccer players
Soccer players from Dallas
American soccer players